The Berserking is a concerto for solo piano and orchestra by the Scottish composer James MacMillan.  The work was commissioned by the Musica Nova Festival and was premiered in Glasgow on 22 September 1990 by the pianist Peter Donohoe and the Royal Scottish National Orchestra under the conductor Matthias Bamert.

Composition

Title and inspiration
The Berserkers was inspired by a group of Norse warriors called Berserkers, who were reported to have fought in an uncontrollable, trance-like fury.  MacMillan wrote in the score program note:

Structure
The Berserkers has a duration of roughly 33 minutes and is composed in one continuous movement of three connected sections.  MacMillan described the form of the piece, writing:

Instrumentation
The work is scored for solo piano and an orchestra comprising two flutes, piccolo, three oboes (3rd doubling cor anglais), three clarinets (3rd doubling bass clarinet), two bassoons, contrabassoon, four horns, three trumpets, two trombones, bass trombone, tuba, timpani, three percussionists, celesta, harp, and strings.

Reception
The Berserking received a very positive response from critics.  Reviewing a recording of the composition, Andrew Clements of The Guardian wrote:
Stephen Johnson of BBC Music Magazine similarly lauded the piece, writing, "The progression from testosterone-fuelled strutting and stamping to sensuous lyrical calm emerges with clarity and drama."

In 2009, the British journalist Simon Heffer declared it "the greatest piece of music written in these islands since the death of Benjamin Britten in 1976."  He added, "But what is so marvellous is that its composer is still alive, still creating, and there could yet be even better to come."

See also
List of compositions by James MacMillan

References

Concertos by James MacMillan
1990 compositions
Piano concertos
Commissioned music